Zain Bhikha is a South African singer-songwriter who performs Islamic nasheed. Associated with other Muslim musicians, including Yusuf Islam and Dawud Wharnsby, Bhikha has collaborated on albums and also released several solo albums.

Bhikha sometimes performs with a drummer and several backup vocalists who were the African singers in the Disney cartoon movie The Lion King. He is widely known for the 2000 release A is for Allah.

Current work
On 24 April 2008, Bhikha participated in an international annual singing competition, named the Al Mahabbah Awards Festival, in Abu Dhabi. Bhikha was accompanied by the aforementioned drummer and backing singers. One song they performed was "Peace Train", composed by Yusuf Islam.

References

External links

Living people
1974 births
South African Muslims
South African people of Indian descent
Nasheed singers
South African expatriates in the United Arab Emirates
South African male singer-songwriters
20th-century South African male singers
21st-century South African male singers